Dominique Brebnor (born March 20, 1975), known professionally as Dominique Jackson and Tyra Allure Ross, is a Tobagonian-American actress, author, model, and reality television personality. As an actress, she is most known for her leading role of Elektra Abundance on the FX television series Pose. As a model, she has appeared in Vogue España.

Early life 
Dominique Jackson was born on March 20, 1975, in Scarborough, Tobago, Trinidad and Tobago. Jackson grew up with her grandmother". She experienced a traumatic upbringing that included bullying and sexual abuse. Her family and community in Tobago did not accept her as transgender, and she was regularly reprimanded for displaying her natural feminine characteristics. At age 15, she moved to the United States and lived with her mother.

During her time in the United States, Jackson experienced homelessness and turned to sex work and living off credit cards for survival. It was in 1993, while living in Baltimore, Maryland, that Jackson was introduced to the ballroom scene. She then lived in various houses, including Revlon and Allure, before settling in the House of Sinclair in New York City.

Career

Modeling 
So that she could develop the right opportunities, Jackson did most of her early modeling work for free. In 2009, she became a resident model for fashion designer Adrian Alicea and walked for the Mercedes-Benz Fashion Week. She has also modeled for Vogue España. She walked for the 2021 Mugler show, along with another trans model Hunter Schafer.

Television and film 
Jackson has appeared in Call Me, Christopher Street: The Series, My Truth, My Story, a Caribbean LGBTQ oral history and storytelling documentary series produced by the Caribbean Equality Project, the documentary Visible: The LGBTQ Caribbean Diaspora and the Oxygen reality television series Strut (2016). Her work on Strut earned her a GLAAD Media Award nomination.

In 2018, Jackson began appearing in the leading role of Elektra Abundance on the FX series Pose, set in the ballroom subculture scene in late-1980s New York City. The series premiered on June 3, 2018, and attracted critical acclaim. The first season boasted the largest cast of transgender actors for a scripted network series, with over 50 transgender characters/actors. She continued her role as Elektra Wintour in Poses second and third seasons.

Writing and community service 

Jackson has been open about her mental health struggles. After a thirteen-year writing process, she released her autobiography The Transsexual from Tobago. She has worked for several nonprofit organizations, such as Destination Tomorrow in the Bronx, that provide outreach and services to the LGBTQ+ community.

Personal life 
Jackson grew up very religious and was an active member of the church from a young age. When she was a child her family moved to New York, but she remained living with her grandmother in Trinidad and Tobago. Jackson revealed that around 11 years old she was sexually abused by a member of her church.

At 15 years old, she moved to Baltimore with her mother. During that time, she came in contact with the trans community for the first time.

She obtained her green card in 2015, and also had her sex reassignment surgery the same year.

Jackson was previously married to Al Jackson. They married at a courthouse in 2016 after dating for about 18 years, and held their wedding ceremony during an episode of Strut.

In 2018, while vacationing at a resort in Aruba with her then-husband, Jackson reported to the authorities that a man attempted to rape her.

In 2020, Jackson revealed on her social media that she had separated from her husband Al in late 2018.

On an episode of House Hunters that aired on June 1st, 2021, it was presented that Jackson was engaged to her personal manager, Edwin Torres.

Filmography

Film

Television

Bibliography 
 The Transsexual from Tobago (Revised) (2013)

See also 
 LGBT culture in New York City
 List of LGBT people from New York City

References

External links 

 
 Caribbean Equality Project's My Truth, My Story – Dominique Jackson

Living people
21st-century American actresses
American writers
American female models
American television actresses
Trinidad and Tobago LGBT people
Transgender actresses
Transgender female models
Transgender writers
LGBT media personalities
Trinidad and Tobago emigrants to the United States
Trinidad and Tobago female models
21st-century Trinidad and Tobago actresses
Trinidad and Tobago television actresses
Trinidad and Tobago writers
LGBT African Americans
21st-century African-American women
21st-century LGBT people
American LGBT actors
1975 births
21st-century Trinidad and Tobago actors